Aspergillus salwaensis is a species of fungus in the genus Aspergillus. It is from the Circumdati section. The species was first described in 2014. It has been reported to produce penicillic acid.

Growth and morphology

A. salwaensis has been cultivated on both Czapek yeast extract agar (CYA) plates and Malt Extract Agar Oxoid® (MEAOX) plates. The growth morphology of the colonies can be seen in the pictures below.

References 

salwaensis
Fungi described in 2014